Colt (also Bonfouca Station) is an unincorporated community in St. Tammany Parish, Louisiana, United States.

Notes

Unincorporated communities in St. Tammany Parish, Louisiana
Unincorporated communities in Louisiana